The Rose & Crown Bar bombing was a bomb attack carried out against  a Catholic-owned pub in Belfast. The attack was carried out by the loyalist paramilitary group the Ulster Volunteer Force (UVF) just less than two weeks before the start of the Ulster Workers' Council strike of May 1974 which brought down the Sunningdale power sharing agreement and just 15 days before the UVF carried out the Dublin and Monaghan bombings which killed 34 and injured 300 people, the highest casualty rate in a single day during The Troubles in either Ireland or Britain.

Background

Loyalists and Unionist from nearly all political and social backgrounds reacted with anger to the Sunningdale agreement in particular the part that offered the Dublin government a say in how Northern Ireland would be governed. Many young Loyalists joined the Loyalist paramilitary groups like the UVF and Ulster Defence Association (UDA).
In the weeks leading up to May 1974 the Loyalist paramilitaries had intensified their campaign. 
On 9 February the UDA shot dead two Catholic civilians in a bar in Belfast 
Two days later on  11 February two more Catholics were killed by the UDA/UFF. On 19 February the UVF killed two more civilians in a bomb attack on a pub in Armagh. On  29 March the UVF bombed Conways bar in Belfast killing two more Catholic civilians. On 21 April the UVF shot dead a Sinn Féin member in Fermanagh.

The Bombing

At around 22:00, terrorists belonging to the UVF (Ulster Volunteer Force) threw a cylinder bomb, laden with 200lb of high explosives, through the front door of the Catholic-owned  Rose & Crown bar on the Lower Ormeau Road. The bomb exploded immediately once inside. The explosion brought the front of the entrance crashing down, making it impossible for people to escape. Five Catholics were killed outright with one more dying from his wounds a day or two later.

Eyewitnesses described scenes of men missing legs or arms and  one man blown in half. A 75-year-old man lost a leg and another man his arm.

Aftermath

A white sedan seen near the building was later found abandoned in a Protestant area half a mile away.

Two teenagers were eventually arrested and jailed for the bombings.

Loyalist paramilitaries killed a total of 51 people, the majority of whom were killed in the Dublin and Monaghan bombings on 17 May and injured about 400 in the month of May 1974 alone, making May 1974 the worst month out of the whole conflict for Loyalist paramilitary attacks.

In 2014, for the 40th anniversary of the bombing, a monument near the bomb site was dedicated to the victims of the UVF atrocity.

See also

Timeline of Ulster Volunteer Force actions
McGurk's Bar bombing
Dublin-Monaghan bombings
Loughinisland massacre

References

Explosions in 1974
Ulster Volunteer Force actions
History of County Antrim
History of Belfast
Terrorism in Northern Ireland
Improvised explosive device bombings in Northern Ireland
1974 in Northern Ireland
Mass murder in 1974
May 1974 events in the United Kingdom
1974 crimes in the United Kingdom
Terrorist incidents in the United Kingdom in 1974
1974 crimes in Ireland
1970s crimes in Northern Ireland
Building bombings in Northern Ireland
Attacks on bars in Northern Ireland